On October 3–4, 1964, Hurricane Hilda and its remnants generated a tornado outbreak over portions of the Southeastern United States. The outbreak, which yielded at least 12 confirmed tornadoes, killed 22 people and injured 175 others. Most of the casualties occurred as a result of a violent tornado that devastated the northern outskirts of Larose, Louisiana, becoming the deadliest hurricane-generated tornado on record since 1900. The tornado was also one of only two F4s known to have been produced by a tropical cyclone, the other having occurred during Hurricane Carla on September 12, 1961.

Background
Although Hilda extensively damaged portions of Louisiana, most of its severest impacts, including the vast majority of fatalities, were related to hurricane-spawned tornadoes, along with inland flooding.

Outbreak statistics

Confirmed tornadoes

October 3 event

October 4 event

See also
List of North American tornadoes and tornado outbreaks
List of tornadoes spawned by tropical cyclones

Notes

References

Sources

F4 tornadoes
Tornadoes of 1964
Tornadoes in Louisiana
1964 in Louisiana